Fort McMurray Public School District No. 2833 or the Fort McMurray Public School District is a publicly funded school district, serving the urban service area of Fort McMurray, Alberta, Canada and the outlying areas.

Schools
 Elementary Schools
 Beacon Hill School (ECDP-6)
 Christina Gordon Public School (ECDP-6)
 Dave McNeilly Public School (ECDP-6)
 Doctor K. A. Clark School (ECDP-6) 
 Ecolé Dickinsfield School (ECDP-6, English and French immersion.)
 Greely Road School (ECDP-6)
 Thickwood Heights School (ECDP-6)
 Timberlea School (ECDP-6)
 Walter & Gladys Hill (ECDP-6)
 Westview School (ECDP-6)
 Senior High School
 Composite High School (7-12)
 École McTavish Public High School (7-12, English and French immersion.)
 Westwood Community High School (7-12, English and French immersion.)
 Alternative and Special Programs
 Fort McMurray Islamic School (ECDP to Grade 9)
 Fort McMurray Christian School (ECDP-9)
 Frank Spragins High School (formerly Second Chance School) (9-12, Alternative module based program.)

See also 
List of Alberta school boards
Fort McMurray Catholic School District

References

External links 
 

Fort McMurray
School districts in Alberta